The following lists events that happened in 2000 in Libya.

Incumbents
President: Muammar al-Gaddafi
Prime Minister: Muhammad Ahmad al-Mangoush (until 1 March), Imbarek Shamekh (starting 1 March)

Events
September to October - Anti-black riots

January 13 - 2000 Marsa Brega Short 360 crash

References

 
Years of the 20th century in Libya
Libya
Libya
2000s in Libya